Peter Larsson Rypdal (10 February 1909 – 9 January 1988) was a Norwegian fiddler and famous traditional folk music composer.

Rypdal was born and died at Tresfjord   in Møre og Romsdal, Norway.   Of the many pieces he composed, two of his wedding marches are still used widely in Norway. In addition to folk music, he had a great interest in classical music, and this interest he shared with his friend Henry Vike (1921–2013), to whom he dedicated the wedding march "A Summer Wedding". Along with musically interested friends he was involved in forming a separate Symphony Orchestra of Tresfjord and Vestnes (1949–64). He already had a string quartet going for many years, which was a popular entertainment performances at many events, and was also a founding member of "Romsdal spelemannslag" (1936).

Rypdal  was inspired by Sigbjørn Bernhoft Osa (1910–1990). He got to meet with the violinist  several times when Osa was on tour in the area.  Osa also used the opportunity to learn tunes from  Rypdal who was often at Osa's concert repertoire.

Personal life
He has several musician descendants including his grandchildren,  Jorun Marie Kvernberg and Ola Kvernberg.

References 

1909 births
1988 deaths
20th-century composers
20th-century violinists
20th-century Norwegian male musicians
Male violinists
Norwegian composers
Norwegian male composers
Norwegian fiddlers
Norwegian violinists
Norwegian traditional musicians
People from Vestnes